The Central African Republic national football team (French: Équipe de République centrafricaine de football), nicknamed Les Fauves, is the national team of the Central African Republic and is controlled by the Central African Football Federation. They are a member of CAF. Despite being traditionally one of the weakest teams in Africa and the world, they recently achieved success. They won the 2009 CEMAC Cup by beating Gabon in the semi-finals and Equatorial Guinea in the final 3–0. Their FIFA ranking rose from 202nd in August 2010 to 89th by July 2011. On 10 October 2010, they earned a shock 2012 Africa Cup of Nations qualifier win at home against Algeria 2–0, which put them top of their qualification group. The team won its first FIFA World Cup qualifier on 2 June 2012 after beating Botswana 2–0 at home.

History

Early years (1956–1989)
The team made its debut under the name of Ubangi-Shari in 1956 against French Cameroon. The Central African Football Federation was founded in 1961 and joined FIFA in 1964 and CAF in 1965.

Their first competitive match was in the 1961 Friendship Games in Ivory Coast where Central African Republic drew twice against Upper Volta and Liberia before losing to the hosts and failing to progress to the next round.

Central African Republic entered the 1974 African Cup of Nations qualification for the first time, progressing due to Gabon's withdrawal but were then eliminated 5–4 on aggregate by Ivory Coast, a tie which saw the second leg abandoned at half-time after arguments between players of both sides, forcing a replay in Lagos which Ivory Coast won 5–1.  

They took part in 1984 UDEAC Cup where they qualified to the knock-out rounds on goal-difference over Equatorial Guinea but were then heavily beaten by Cameroon 7–1 before beating Gabon on penalties to finish third. However in the 1988 UDEAC Cup, Gabon would get their revenge, beating Central African Republic in the semi-finals. The following year Central African Republic would host the 1989 UDEAC Cup, making it to the finals, beating Gabon on the way, before losing 2–1 to Cameroon.

Sporadic matches (1990–2008)

During the 1990s, Central African Republic played very few international games, withdrawing from the 1996 African Cup of Nations qualification without playing a match. They returned to competition in the UNIFAC Cup in 1999, winning three times and losing twice to finish second.

Central African Republic participated in the 2002 World Cup qualifiers for the first time, losing in the first round to Zimbabwe. They reached the final of the inaugural CEMAC Cup, losing to an amateur Cameroon team that they'd drawn with a week earlier in the tournament.

Promising victories (2009–present)

In 2009, Central African Republic hosted the 2009 CEMAC Cup where they defeated Equatorial Guinea 3–0 in the final, with goals from Salif Kéïta and a brace from Hilaire Momi to claim their first trophy. 

During the 2012 Africa Cup of Nations qualifiers, Central African Republic achieved a historic 2-0 home victory over the top seeded Algeria, a team that had recently competed at the 2010 FIFA World Cup. In July 2011, they climbed to 89th place in the FIFA world rankings, having occupied 202nd place as recently as August 2010. 

On 2 June 2012, they obtained their first victory in World Cup qualification, beating Botswana 2-0 at home. Despite that positive result, Central African Republic finished bottom of their group. On 15 June 2012, despite being reduced to ten men, they achieved another impressive victory, beating Egypt (3–2) in the 2013 Africa Cup of Nations qualifiers, inflicting the first home defeat on the Egyptians in AFCON qualifiers since 1965. Thanks to a 1-1 draw at home in the second leg, Central African Republic eliminated the Egyptians, but in the second round they were defeated by Burkina Faso.

Results and fixtures

2021

2022

2023

Coaching history
Caretaker managers are listed in italics.

 Jules Accorsi (2010–2012)
 Herve Lougoundji (2012–2014)
 Raoul Savoy (2014–2015)
 Blaise Kopogo (2015)
 Herve Lougoundji (2015–2017)
 Raoul Savoy (2017–2019)
 François Zahoui (2019–2021)
 Raoul Savoy (2021–present)

Players

Current squad
The following players were selected for the 2023 AFCON qualification matches against Madagascar on 23 March & 27 March 2023.

Caps and goals as of 5 June 2022, after the match against Ghana.

Recent call-ups
The following players have also been called up to the Central African Republic squad within the last twelve months.

INJ Withdrew due to injury
PRE Preliminary squad
RET Retired from the national team
SUS Serving suspension
WD Player withdrew from the squad due to non-injury issue.

Records

Players in bold are still active with Central African Republic.

Most appearances

Top goalscorers

Competitive record

FIFA World Cup

Africa Cup of Nations

Head-to-head record 
As of 17 November 2020 after match against

FIFA ranking history
End of each year only

Achievements 
CEMAC Cup
Champions (1): 2009
Runners-up (1): 2003
UNIFAC Cup
Runners-up (1): 1999

Notes

References

External links 

centrafriquefootball
Central African Republic at FIFA.com

 
African national association football teams